The 1923 USA Outdoor Track and Field Championships women's competition were the first national track and field championships for women in the United States. The tournament was held on 29 September 1923 at Weequahic Park in Newark, New Jersey.

Background 
After the initial Women's World Games in 1922 in Paris and the three Women's Olympiads (1921 Women's Olympiad, 1922 Women's Olympiad and 1923 Women's World Games) in Monaco, interest in women's sports grew internationally. In 1922, the Women's Amateur Athletic Association (WAAA) was founded in the United Kingdom. The WAAA organised the first official British women's championships in track and field (WAAA Championships) on 18 August 1923 at the Oxo Sports Ground in Downham outside London.

In the United States, the Amateur Athletic Union (AAU) was founded in 1888, and held its first national championship for women in the sport of swimming in 1916. In 1922, try-outs for the 1922 Women's World Games were held on 13 May at Oaksmere School in Mamaroneck, New York. Some historians consider this event to be the first "national" women's track meet.

In 1923, the AAU sponsored the first official American women's championships in track and field.

Events 
The meet was held on 29 September 1923 at Weequahic Park in Newark, New Jersey. Female athletes for the 1923 games also trained at Weequahic Park.

The athletes competed in 11 events: running 50 yards, 100 yards, relay race 4x110 yards, hurdling 60 yards, high jump, long jump, discus throw, shot put, javelin, baseball throw (softball throw) and basketball throw. The tournament was a huge promotion for women's sports.

Results 

Elinor Churchill's baseball throw of 234 feet, 5 ¾ inches also was a new world record, improving her record set the previous year by more than 10 feet.

References

External links 
 Outdoor Track & Field Champions (USA Track & Field)
 USA National Championships – Women (Trackfield.brinkster.net)

USA Outdoor Track and Field Championships
Usa Outdoor Track And Field Championships, 1923
Track and field
Sports in New Jersey
Track and field in New Jersey
1923 in multi-sport events
1923 in women's athletics
1923 in American women's sports
1923 in women's history
Women's sports in New Jersey